The Burke and Wills expedition was organised by the Royal Society of Victoria in Australia in 1860–61. It consisted of 19 men led by Robert O'Hara Burke and William John Wills, with the objective of crossing Australia from Melbourne in the south, to the Gulf of Carpentaria in the north, a distance of around 3,250 kilometres (approximately 2,000 miles). At that time most of the inland of Australia had not been explored by non-Indigenous people and was largely unknown to the European settlers.

The expedition left Melbourne in winter. Very bad weather, poor roads and broken-down horse wagons meant they made slow progress at first. After dividing the party at Menindee on the Darling River Burke made good progress, reaching Cooper Creek at the beginning of summer. The expedition established a depot camp at the Cooper, and Burke, Wills and two other men pushed on to the north coast (although swampland stopped them from reaching the northern coastline).

The return journey was plagued by delays and monsoon rains, and when they reached the depot at Cooper Creek, they found it had been abandoned just hours earlier. Burke and Wills died on or about 30 June 1861. Several relief expeditions were sent out, all contributing new geographical findings. Altogether, seven men died, and only one man, the Irish soldier John King, crossed the continent with the expedition and returned alive to Melbourne.

Background
Gold was discovered in Victoria in 1851 and the subsequent gold rush led to a huge influx of migrants, with the local population increasing from 29,000 in 1851 to 139,916 in 1861 (Sydney had 93,686 at the time). The colony became very wealthy and Melbourne grew rapidly to become Australia's largest city and the second largest city of the British Empire. The boom lasted forty years and ushered in the era known as "marvellous Melbourne". The influx of educated gold seekers from England, Ireland and Germany led to rapid growth of schools, churches, learned societies, libraries and art galleries. The University of Melbourne was founded in 1855 and the State Library of Victoria in 1856. The Philosophical Institute of Victoria was founded in 1854 and became the Royal Society of Victoria after receiving a Royal Charter in 1859.

By 1855 there was speculation about possible routes for the Australian Overland Telegraph Line to connect Australia to the new telegraph cable in Java and then Europe. There was fierce competition between the colonies over the route with governments recognising the economic benefits that would result from becoming the centre of the telegraph network. A number of routes were considered including Ceylon to Albany in Western Australia, or Java to the north coast of Australia and then either onto east coast, or south through the centre of the continent to Adelaide. The Government of Victoria organised the Burke and Wills expedition to cross the continent in 1860. The Government of South Australia offered a reward of £2000 to encourage an expedition to find a route between South Australia and the north coast.

Exploration Committee

In 1857 the Philosophical Institute formed an Exploration Committee with the aim of investigating the practicability of fitting out an exploring expedition. While interest in inland exploration was strong in the neighbouring colonies of New South Wales and South Australia, in Victoria enthusiasm was limited. Even the anonymous donation of £1,000 (later discovered to be from Ambrose Kyte) to the Fund Raising Committee of the Royal Society failed to generate much interest and it was 1860 before sufficient money was raised and the expedition was assembled.

The Exploration Committee called for offers of interest for a leader for the Victorian Exploring Expedition. Only two members of the committee, Ferdinand von Mueller and Wilhelm Blandowski, had any experience in exploration but due to factionalism both were consistently outvoted. Several people were considered for the post of leader and the Society held a range of meetings in early 1860. Robert O'Hara Burke was selected by committee ballot as the leader, and William John Wills was recommended as surveyor, navigator and third-in-command. Burke had no experience in exploration and it is strange that he was chosen to lead the expedition. Burke was an Irish-born ex-officer with the Austrian army, and later became police superintendent with virtually no skills in bushcraft. Wills was more adept than Burke at living in the wilderness, but it was Burke's leadership that was especially detrimental to the mission.

Rather than take cattle to be slaughtered during the trip the Committee decided to experiment with dried meat. The weight required three extra wagons and was to slow the expedition down appreciably.

Instructions from the Exploration Committee

The Victorian Exploration Committee gave Burke written instructions. These included suggestions for the route to take but also gave Burke discretion depending on conditions and barriers he might encounter. The instructions were signed by the Honorary Secretary Dr John Macadam and in part advised:

Members of the Exploration Committee
The Exploration Committee of the Royal Society of Victoria included:

 Sir William Foster Stawell, Chief Justice of Victoria
 Dr David Elliott Wilkie MD., Treasurer
 Dr John Macadam, Honorary Secretary
 Professor Georg Neumayer
 Dr Ferdinand von Mueller, Government Botanist
 Sir Frederick McCoy, Melbourne University's first professor
 The Hon. Captain Andrew Clarke
 Dr Richard Eades, Mayor of Melbourne
 Charles Whybrow Ligar, Government Surveyor General
 The Hon Sir Francis Murphy, Speaker of the Legislative Assembly
 Lieutenant John Randall Pascoe, JP
 Captain Francis Cadell
 Alfred Selwyn Esq., Government Geologist
 Reverend Father Dr John Ignatius Bleasdale
 Clement Hodgkinson Esq.
 Dr J William McKenna
 Edward Wilson, Editor of the Argus
 Dr William Gilbee
 Sizar Elliott Esq.
 Dr Solomon Iffla
 Angus McMillan Esq.
 James Smith Esq.
 John Watson Esq.

Camels

Camels had been used successfully in desert exploration in other parts of the world, but by 1859 only seven camels had been imported into Australia.
The Victorian Government appointed George James Landells to purchase 24 camels in India for use in desert exploration. The animals arrived in Melbourne in June 1860 and the Exploration Committee purchased an additional six from George Coppin's Cremorne Gardens. The camels were initially housed in the stables at Parliament House and later moved to Royal Park. Twenty-six camels were taken on the expedition, with six (two females with their two young calves and two males) being left in Royal Park.

Departure from Melbourne

The expedition set off from Royal Park, Melbourne at about 4 pm on 20 August 1860 watched by around 15,000 spectators. The 19 men of the expedition included six Irishmen, five Englishmen, three Afghan and one Indian camel drivers, three Germans and an American. They took 23 horses, 6 wagons and 26 camels.

The expedition took a large amount of equipment, including enough food to last two years, a cedar-topped oak camp table with two chairs, rockets, flags and a Chinese gong; the equipment all together weighed as much as 20 tonnes.

Committee member Captain Francis Cadell had offered to transport the supplies from Adelaide up the Murray River to the junction with the Darling River to be collected on the way.
However, Burke declined his offer, possibly because Cadell had opposed Burke's appointment as leader of the expedition.

Everything was instead loaded onto six wagons. One wagon broke down before it had even left Royal Park and by midnight of the first day the expedition had reached only Essendon on the edge of Melbourne. At Essendon two more wagons broke down. Heavy rains and bad roads made travelling through Victoria difficult and time-consuming. The party arrived at Lancefield on 23 August and set up their fourth camp. The first day off was taken on Sunday 26 August at Camp VI in Mia Mia.

 
The expedition reached Swan Hill on 6 September and arrived in Balranald on 15 September. There, to lighten the load, they left behind their sugar, lime juice and some of their guns and ammunition. At Gambala on 24 September, Burke decided to load some of the provisions onto the camels for the first time, and to lessen the burden on the horses he ordered the men to walk. At Bilbarka on the Darling, Burke and his second-in-command, Landells, argued after Burke decided to dump the 60 gallons (≈270 litres) of rum that Landells had brought to feed to the camels in the belief that it prevented scurvy. At Kinchega on the Darling, Landells resigned from the expedition, followed by the expedition's surgeon, Dr Hermann Beckler. Third-in-command Wills was promoted to second-in-command. They reached Menindee on 12 October having taken two months to travel  from Melbourne—the regular mail coach did the journey in little more than a week. Two of the expedition's five officers had resigned, thirteen members of the expedition had been fired and eight new men had been hired.

In July 1859 the South Australian government offered a reward of £2,000 (about A$289,000 in 2011 dollars) for the first successful south–north crossing of the continent west of the 143rd line of longitude. The experienced explorer John McDouall Stuart had taken up the challenge. Burke was concerned Stuart might beat him to the north coast and he soon grew impatient with their slow progress often averaging only  an hour. Burke split the group, taking the strongest horses, seven of the fittest men and a small amount of equipment, with plans to push on quickly to Cooper Creek (then known as Cooper's Creek) and then wait for the others to catch up. They left Menindee on 19 October, guided by William Wright who was appointed third-in-command. Travel was relatively easy because recent rain made water abundant, while in unusually mild weather temperatures exceeded  only twice before the party reached Cooper Creek. At Torowotto Swamp Wright was sent back to Menindee alone to bring up the remainder of the men and supplies and Burke continued on to Cooper Creek.

Cooper Creek

In 1860 Cooper Creek was the outer limit of the land that had been explored by Europeans, the river having been visited by Captain Charles Sturt in 1845 and Augustus Charles Gregory in 1858. Burke arrived at the Cooper on 11 November and they formed a depot at Camp LXIII (Camp 63) while they conducted reconnaissance to the north. A plague of rats forced the men to move camp and they formed a second depot further downstream at Bullah Bullah Waterhole. This was Camp LXV (Camp 65) and they erected a stockade and named the place Fort Wills.

It was thought that Burke would wait at Cooper Creek until autumn (March the next year) so that they would avoid having to travel during the hot Australian summer. However, Burke waited only until Sunday, 16 December before deciding to make a dash for the Gulf of Carpentaria. He split the group again, leaving William Brahe in charge of the depot, with Dost Mahomet, William Patton and Thomas McDonough. Burke, Wills, John King and Charles Gray set off for the Gulf with six camels, one horse and enough food for just three months. By now it was mid-summer and the daily temperature often reached  in the shade, and in the Strzelecki and Sturt Stony Deserts there was very little shade to be found. Brahe was ordered by Burke to wait for three months; however, the more conservative Wills had reviewed the maps and developed a more realistic view of the task ahead, and secretly instructed Brahe to wait for four months.

Gulf of Carpentaria

Except for the heat, travel was easy. As a result of recent rains water was still easy to find and the Aborigines, contrary to expectations, were peaceful. On 9 February 1861 they reached the Little Bynoe River, an arm of the Flinders River delta, where they found they could not reach the ocean because of the mangrove swamps in their way. Burke and Wills left the camels behind with King and Gray at Camp CXIX (Camp 119), and set off through the swamps, although after  they decided to turn back. By this stage, they were desperately short of supplies. They had food left for 27 days, but it had already taken them 59 days to travel from Cooper Creek.

On their way north, the weather had been hot and dry, but on the way back the wet season broke and the tropical monsoonal rains began. A camel named Golah Sing was abandoned on 4 March when it was unable to continue. Three other camels were shot and eaten along the way and they shot their only horse, Billy, on 10 April on the Diamantina River, south of what is today the town of Birdsville. Equipment was abandoned at a number of locations as the number of pack animals was reduced. One of these locations, Return Camp 32, was relocated in 1994 and The Burke and Wills Historical Society mounted an expedition to verify the discovery of camel bones in 2005.

To extend their food supply, they ate portulaca. Gray also caught an  Python (probably Aspidites melanocephalus, a black-headed python), which they ate. Both Burke and Gray immediately came down with dysentery. Gray was ill, but Burke thought he was "gammoning" (pretending). On 25 March on the Burke River (just south of what is now the town of Boulia), Gray was caught stealing skilligolee (a type of watery porridge) and Burke beat him. By 8 April, Gray could not walk; he died on 17 April of dysentery at a place they called Polygonum Swamp. The location of Gray's death is unknown, although it is generally believed to be Lake Massacre in South Australia. While the possibility that Burke killed Gray has been discounted, the severity of the beating Burke gave has been widely debated. The three surviving men stopped for a day to bury Gray, and to recover their strength—they were by this stage very weak from hunger and exhaustion. They finally reached Cooper Creek on 21 April, only to find that the camp had been abandoned several hours earlier.

Return to Cooper Creek 

Burke had asked Brahe and the depot party to remain at the camp on the Cooper for 13 weeks. The party had actually waited for 18 weeks and was running low on supplies and starting to feel the effects of scurvy; they had come to believe that Burke would never return from the Gulf. After one of his men had injured his leg, Brahe decided to return to Menindee, but before leaving buried some provisions in case Burke did return, and blazed (cut or carved) a message on a tree to mark the spot.

Brahe left the depot on Cooper Creek on the morning of Sunday, 21 April 1861. Burke, Wills and King returned that evening. Finding the camp deserted, they dug up the cache of supplies, and a letter explaining that the party had given up waiting and had left. Burke's team had missed them by only nine hours. The three men and two remaining camels were exhausted; they had no hope of catching up to the main party.

They decided to rest and recuperate, living off the supplies left in the cache. Wills and King wanted to follow their outward track back to Menindee, but Burke overruled them and decided to attempt to reach the furthest outpost of pastoral settlement in South Australia, a cattle station near Mount Hopeless. They wrote a letter explaining their intentions and reburied it in the cache under the marked tree in case a rescue party visited the area. Unfortunately, they did not change the mark on the tree or alter the date. On 23 April they set off, following the Cooper downstream and then heading out into the Strzelecki Desert towards Mount Hopeless.

Meanwhile, while returning to Menindee, Brahe had met with Wright trying to reach the Cooper with the supplies. The two men decided to go back to Cooper Creek to see if Burke had returned. When they arrived on Sunday, 8 May, Burke had already left for Mount Hopeless, and the camp was again deserted. As the mark and date on the tree were unaltered, Brahe and Wright assumed that Burke had not returned, and did not think to check whether the supplies were still buried. They left to rejoin the main party and return to Menindee.

Controversy 
Brahe might have stayed at Cooper Creek longer, but one of his men, the blacksmith Patton, had injured his leg after being thrown from his horse, so they decided to leave for Menindee that morning. Patton was to die from complications six weeks later. Burke and Wills discussed catching up with them, but they were too exhausted and decided to wait.

Meanwhile, the other mission led by William Wright was having terrible problems of its own. Wright was supposed to bring supplies up from Menindee to Cooper Creek, but it was the end of January 1861 before he managed to set out from Menindee. Wright's delay subsequently resulted in his being blamed for the deaths of Burke and Wills. In 1963, Alan Moorehead wrote of the 'mystery' surrounding Wright's delay:

An in-depth study of Wright's action formed a part of Dr Tom Bergin's 1982 MA thesis. Bergin, who recreated the original journey from Cooper Creek to the Gulf of Carpentaria with camels in 1978, showed that a lack of money and too few pack animals to carry the supplies meant Wright was placed in an unenviable position. His requests to the Exploration Committee were not acted on until early January, by which time the hot weather and lack of water meant that the party moved extremely slowly. They were harassed by the Bandjigali and Karenggapa Murris, and three of the men, Dr Ludwig Becker, Charles Stone and William Purcell, died from malnutrition on the trip. On his way north, Wright camped at Koorliatto Waterhole on the Bulloo River while he tried to find Burke's tracks to Cooper Creek. While he was there he met Brahe, who was on his way back from the Cooper to Menindee.

The Dig Tree

Brahe blazed two trees at Depot Camp LXV on the banks of Bullah Bullah Waterhole on Cooper Creek, both are coolibahs (Eucalyptus coolabah formerly Eucalyptus microtheca) and both are estimated to be at least 250 years old. One tree has two blazes on it; one denoting the date of arrival and the date of departure "DEC-6-60" carved over "APR-21-61" and the other showing the initial "B" (for Burke) carved over the Roman numerals for (camp) 65; "B" over "LXV". The date blaze has grown closed and only the camp number blaze remains visible today. On an adjacent smaller tree Brahe carved the instruction to 'DIG'. The exact inscription is not known, but is variously recalled to be "DIG", "DIG under", "DIG 3 FT N.W.", "DIG 3FT N.E." or "DIG 21 APR 61".

Initially the tree with the Date and Camp Number blaze was known as "Brahe's Tree" or the "Depot Tree" and the tree under which Burke died attracted most attention and interest. However, the tree at Depot Camp LXV became known as the "Dig Tree" from at least 1912.

In 1899 John Dick carved a likeness of Burke's face in a nearby tree along with his initials, his wife's initials and the date.

Burke, Wills and King alone at Cooper Creek
After leaving the Dig Tree they rarely travelled more than  a day. One of the two remaining camels, Landa, became bogged in Minkie Waterhole and the other, Rajah was shot when he could travel no further. Without pack animals, Burke, Wills and King were unable to carry enough water to leave Cooper Creek and cross the Strzelecki Desert to Mount Hopeless, and so the three men were unable to leave the creek. Their supplies were running low and they were malnourished and exhausted. The Cooper Creek Aborigines, the Yandruwandha people, gave them fish, beans called padlu and a type of damper made from the ground sporocarps of the ngardu (nardoo) plant (Marsilea drummondii) in exchange for sugar.

At the end of May 1861, Wills returned to the Dig Tree to put his diary, notebook and journals in the cache for safekeeping. Burke bitterly criticised Brahe in his journal for not leaving behind any supplies or animals. While Wills was away from camp, Burke foolishly shot his pistol at one of the Aborigines, causing the whole group to flee. Within a month of the Aborigines' departure, Burke and Wills both perished.

Death

Towards the end of June 1861 as the three men were following the Cooper upstream to find the Yandruwandha campsite, Wills became too weak to continue. He was left behind at his own insistence at Breerily Waterhole with some food, water and shelter. Burke and King continued upstream for another two days until Burke became too weak to continue. The next morning Burke died. King stayed with his body for two days and then returned downstream to Breerily Waterhole, where he found that Wills had died as well.

The exact dates on which Burke and Wills died are unknown and different dates are given on various memorials in Victoria. The Exploration Committee fixed 28 June 1861 as the date both explorers died. King found a group of Yandruwandha willing to give him food and shelter and in return he shot birds to contribute to their supplies.

Rescue expeditions
In 1861, five expeditions were sent out to search for Burke and Wills; two commissioned by the Exploration Committee of the Royal Society of Victoria, one by the Government of Victoria one by the Government of Queensland and one by the Government of South Australia. HMCSS Victoria was sent from Melbourne to search the Gulf of Carpentaria for the missing expedition, and SS Firefly sailed from Melbourne to Brisbane where they picked up Landsborough's Queensland Relief Expedition. The other expeditions went overland, with Howitt's Victorian Contingent Party departing from Melbourne, McKinlay's South Australian Burke Relief Expedition departing from Adelaide and Walker's Victorian Relief Expedition departing from Rockhampton.

Victorian Contingent Party
After six months without receiving word from the Burke expedition, the media began questioning its whereabouts. Public pressure for answers increased and on 13 June 1861, the Exploration Committee agreed to send a search party to find the Burke and Wills expedition and, if necessary, offer them support. The Victorian Contingent Party left Melbourne on 26 June 1861 under the leadership of Alfred William Howitt. At the Loddon River, Howitt met Brahe, who was returning from Cooper Creek. As Brahe did not have knowledge of Burke's whereabouts, Howitt decided a much larger expedition would be required to find the missing party. Leaving three of his men at the river, Howitt returned to Melbourne with Brahe to update the Exploration Committee. On 30 June, the expanded expedition left to follow Burke's trail. On 3 September, the party reached Cooper Creek, on 11 September the Dig Tree, and four days later Edwin Welch found King living with the Yandruwandha. Over the next nine days, Howitt found the remains of Burke and Wills and buried them. In pitiful condition, King survived the two-month trip back to Melbourne, and died eleven years later, aged 33, never having recovered his health. He is buried in the Melbourne General Cemetery.

HMVS Victoria

On 4 August 1861, HMVS Victoria under the Command of William Henry Norman sailed from Hobson's Bay in Victoria with orders to search the Gulf of Carpentaria. The Victorian Government also chartered Firefly (188 tons, built 1843) to assist with transportation. Firefly left Hobson's Bay (Melbourne) on 29 July and arrived at Moreton Bay (Brisbane) on 10 August 1861, the same day as HMVS Victoria. Firefly transported the Queensland party led by William Landsborough, and thirty horses. The two ships sailed for the Gulf of Carpentaria on 24 August 1861.

The ships became separated in a storm on 1 September and Firefly hit a reef off Sir Charles Hardy Islands. The crew were able to free and save 26 of the horses by cutting a hole in the side of the ship. Victoria arrived shortly afterwards. Firefly was repaired and able to be towed by Victoria. They recommenced their journey on 22 September, arriving near Sweers Island and Albert River on 29 September, where they rendezvoused with the brig Gratia and the schooner Native Lass, which had also been chartered by the Victorian Government as support. They established a land base on Sweers, after visiting Bentinck Island and finding it inhabited by "hostile natives".

Queensland Relief Expedition
After disembarking from Victoria in November, the Queensland Relief Expedition, under the leadership of William Landsborough, searched the gulf coast for the missing expedition. The party proceeded south and while they found no trace of the Burke and Wills party they continued all the way to Melbourne arriving in August 1862. This was the first European expedition to traverse mainland Australia from northern to southern coast. In 1881, the Queensland Parliament awarded Landsborough £2000 for his achievements as an explorer.

Victorian Relief Expedition

Frederick Walker led the Victorian Relief Expedition. The party, consisting of twelve mounted men, seven of them ex-troopers from the Native Police Corps, started from Rockhampton on 7 September 1861 with the goal of reaching the Gulf of Carpentaria. They found traces of Burke and followed them to Burke's northernmost Camp, but lost the trail from there. On 4 December, they came across a group of Aborigines, killing 12 in the fight that ensued. On 7 December, Walker met up with the HMVS Victoria in the Gulf. Walker's party went on to explore much of the Gulf region.

South Australian Burke Relief Expedition
The South Australian House of Assembly chose John McKinlay to lead the South Australian relief expedition that left Adelaide on 16 August 1861. On 20 October the grave of a European, thought to be Charles Gray, was found at Polygonum Swamp near Cooper Creek. Finding another grave nearby, McKinlay assumed that the Burke expedition had been killed there and named the site Massacre Lake. Learning that Howitt had found the remains of Burke and Wills, McKinlay decided to search in the direction of Central Mount Stuart but was driven back by heavy rains and floods. McKinlay then made for the Gulf of Carpentaria, hoping to find Victoria still there. By 20 May 1862, McKinlay was around five miles (8 km) from the shore of the Gulf, but the intervening country was found to be impassable and he decided to turn east and make for Port Denison on the north Queensland coast. On 2 August 1862, McKinlay reached a station on the Bowen River near Port Denison and after resting a few days the expedition reached Port Denison. The party then returned by sea to Adelaide. McKinlay received a grant of £1000 from the government and a gold watch from the Royal Geographical Society of England.

1862 Victorian Exploration Party
In 1862 Alfred Howitt was tasked with returning to Cooper Creek, exhuming Burke and Wills' remains and returning them to Melbourne for a State Funeral. On 9 December 1861 Howitt left Melbourne for the Cooper. After a long stay in Menindee and again at Mount Murchison the party arrived at Cooper Creek on 25 February 1862, camping at Cullyamurra waterhole. From there Howitt undertook numerous exploratory trips into the surrounding area. On 13 April 1862, Wills' remains were exhumed, and in September 1862, Burke's bones were retrieved from the grave that Howitt had dug a year earlier.

For the next six months Howitt explored the Australian interior before deciding in November to return to the settled areas. On 8 December the party arrived in Clare, South Australia. Howitt and the expedition's doctor continued on to Adelaide while the rest of the expedition members followed three days later by train. Burke's and Wills' remains were then taken to Melbourne, arriving on 29 December 1862.

Presentation to the Yandruwandha
Breastplates were issued to Aboriginal people between 1815 and 1946 for faithful service, for saving the lives of non-Indigenous people and to recognise stockmen and trackers. On this trip to exhume Burke and Wills' remains, Howitt presented three breastplates commissioned by the Victorian Exploration Committee to the Yandruwandha people in appreciation of the assistance they had given to Burke, Wills and King. One of these plates is in the collection of the National Museum of Australia. The inscription on the plate states that it was presented "for the Humanity shewn to the Explorers Burke, Wills and King 1861".

Cause of death

Unknown to the explorers, ngardu sporocarps contain the enzyme thiaminase, which depletes the body of vitamin B1 (thiamin). It is probable that they were not preparing the seedcakes in accordance with Aboriginal food preparation methods, as the food was a staple among the local people. It has been argued that they did not first process the food into a paste, which might have prevented the ill effects they suffered. Despite eating, the men got weaker and weaker. Wills wrote in his diary:My pulse is at 48 and very weak and my legs and arms are nearly skin and bone. I can only look out like Mr Micawber for something to turn up, but starvation on nardoo is by no means unpleasant, but for the weakness one feels, and the utter inability to move oneself, for as the appetite is concerned, it gives me the greatest satisfaction.

As a result, it is likely that the deaths of Burke and Wills resulted in part from a vitamin deficiency disease called beriberi. Evidence to this effect is further provided by King's account, which revealed that Burke complained of leg and back pain shortly before his death. However, other research suggests that scurvy (vitamin C deficiency) and environmental factors also contributed to their deaths.

Cooper Creek summary

 11 November 1860. Burke, Wills, King, Gray, Brahe, Mahomet, Patton and McDonough made their first camp on what they thought was Cooper Creek, but which was actually the Wilson River. This was Camp LVII (Camp 57).
 20 November 1860. The first Depôt Camp was established at Camp LXIII (Camp 63).
 6 December 1860. The Depôt Camp was moved downstream to Camp LXV—The Dig Tree (Camp 65).
 16 December 1860. Burke, Wills, King and Gray left the Depôt for the Gulf of Carpentaria.
 16 December 1860—21 April 1861. Brahe is left in charge of the Depôt at Cooper Creek.
 21 April 1861. Brahe buried a cache of supplies, carved a message in the Dig Tree and headed back to Menindee. Later that day, Burke, Wills and King returned from the Gulf to find the Depôt deserted.
 23 April 1861. Burke, Wills and King followed the Cooper downstream heading towards Mount Hopeless in South Australia.
 7 May 1861. The last camel, Rajah, died. The men cannot carry enough supplies to leave the creek.
 8 May 1861. Brahe and Wright return to the Dig Tree. They stayed only 15 minutes and did not dig up Burke's note in the cache.
 30 May 1861. Wills, having failed to reach Mount Hopeless, returned to the Dig Tree to bury his notebooks in the cache for safe-keeping.
 End of June/ early July 1861. Burke and Wills died.
 11 September 1861. Howitt, leader of the Burke Relief Expedition arrived at the Dig Tree.
 15 September 1861. Howitt found King the only survivor of the four men who reached the Gulf.
 28 September 1861. Howitt dug up the cache at the 'Dig Tree' and recovered Wills' notebooks.

Deaths on the Victorian Exploring Expedition
 Charley Gray, Wednesday, 17 April 1861 at Polygonum Swamp.
 Charles Stone, Monday, 22 April 1861 at Koorliatto Waterhole, Bulloo River.
 William Purcell, Tuesday, 23 April 1861 at Koorliatto Waterhole, Bulloo River.
 Dr Ludwig Becker, Monday, 29 April 1861 at Koorliatto Waterhole, Bulloo River.
 William Patten, Wednesday, 5 June 1861 near Desolation Camp, Rat Point.
 William John Wills, the official date of death adopted by the Exploration Committee was Wednesday, 28 June 1861, but Wills probably died around Friday, 30 June or Saturday, 1 July 1861 at Breerily Waterhole, Cooper Creek.
 Robert O'Hara Burke, the official date of death adopted by the Exploration Committee was Wednesday, 28 June 1861, but Burke probably died on Saturday, 1 July 1861 at Burke's Waterhole, Cooper Creek.

Afterwards

The Victorian Government held a Commission of Enquiry into the deaths of Burke and Wills. Howitt was sent back to Cooper Creek to recover their bodies.

Commission of Enquiry

A Commission of Enquiry was convened on 18 November 1861, and the results of their investigations were presented to both houses of the Colonial Parliament. It was laid on the table of the Legislative Council on 4 March 1862.

The Commission found that Burke "evinced far greater amount of zeal than prudence in finally departing from Cooper's Creek before the depot party had arrived from Menindie", found the conduct of Mr Wright "to have been reprehensible" and had some sympathy for Brahe, upon whom "a responsibility far beyond his expectations devolved upon him". The Commission judged that in leaving the depot before Burke returned or further relief had arrived was regrettable, but that Brahe had "acted from a conscientious desire to discharge his duty."

Subsequent historians have posited that the commissioners were compromised by their close relationships with members of the Royal Society and failed to question them with the same zeal that was applied to men like Brahe.

Funeral
 Howitt sailed from Adelaide to Melbourne on the SS Havilah with the remains of Burke and Wills in a small wooden box, arriving at Sandridge on 28 December 1862. The box was taken to the hall of the Royal Society of Victoria, and a coffining ceremony was held on 31 December. This ceremony was delayed because Macadam, who held the only key to the box, arrived late. A lock smith was called but before he could pick the lock Dr Macadam, blaming his own distress for his lateness, finally arrived with the key.

The remains were placed in state for two weeks and around 100,000 people visited the Royal Society of Victoria to view the coffins.

It was originally proposed that the funeral should take place at St James Cathedral but it was decided this would be impractical because of the expected crowds and the difficulty of moving the coffins into the church from the grand mourning vehicle.  It was agreed that a service at the cemetery would be appropriate.

The order and carriage of the clergy was discussed with agreement that they would walk in the procession with the Protestant clergy in front followed by the Roman Catholics. This small example of ecumenism is interesting given the general enmity and divisive sectarianism between Irish Catholics and English Protestants that blighted Victoria's history for a century.

The funeral was held on 21 January 1863. It was an elaborate affair, with the funeral car modelled on the design used for the Duke of Wellington ten years earlier.  It was estimated that 40,000 people lined the streets of Melbourne.  Melbourne's population was estimated at only 120,000 at the time. Many had travelled from country Victoria, especially the Castlemaine area where Burke had served most recently as Police Superintendent. (The total population of Victoria was about 600,000).

Burke and Wills were buried at the Melbourne General Cemetery. At the cemetery the Dean of Melbourne, Hussey Burgh Macartney, conducted a Church of England burial service, but clergy representing various Christian denominations were represented in the funeral procession.

At 8 p.m. that evening there was a public meeting at St. George's Hall, where Macadam addressed the crowd, and acknowledged the contributions of Ambrose Kyte, Howitt, and Commander Norman.

Legacy
In some ways the tragic expedition was not a waste. It completed the picture of inland Australia, and proved that there was no inland sea. More importantly, each of the rescue parties sent from different parts of the continent added in some way to the understanding of the land it crossed.

In 1862 monuments were erected in Back Creek Cemetery, Bendigo, and also on the hill overlooking Castlemaine where Burke had been stationed before leading the expedition. The Victorian towns of Beechworth and Fryerstown also unveiled memorials.

In 1863, when Julius von Haast searched for a crossing from Otago to the West Coast in New Zealand, he named two rivers flowing into the Haast River after Burke and Wills.

On 21 April 1865, the anniversary of the return to Cooper's Creek, a monument by Charles Summers was unveiled in Melbourne by the Governor, Sir Charles Darling.

In 1867 Ballarat erected the Explorer's Fountain on Sturt and Lydiard Streets. Wills, his brother Tom and their father, Dr William Wills, had all lived in Ballarat.

In 1890 a monument was erected at Royal Park, the expedition's departure point in Melbourne. The plaque on the monument states, "This memorial has been erected to mark the spot from whence the Burke and Wills Expedition started on 20 August 1860. After successfully accomplishing their mission the two brave leaders perished on their return journey at Coopers Creek in June 1861."

In 1983 they were honoured on a postage stamp depicting their portraits issued by Australia Post. In August 2010 Australia Post issued four stamps to commemorate the 150th anniversary.

In 1918 a silent movie, A Romance of Burke and Wills Expedition of 1860, was released. The plot is fictional and only loosely connected to the Burke and Wills expedition.

In 1975 an episode of a British documentary series called The Explorers on the BBC featured the Australian expedition story, in an episode titled Burke and Wills, narrated by David Attenborough (replaced with narration by Anthony Quinn in the later 1976 US broadcast) and directed by Lord Snowdon.

In 1985 the film, Burke & Wills, was made with Jack Thompson as Burke, and Nigel Havers as Wills. Also in 1985, the spoof Wills & Burke was released with Garry McDonald as Burke and Kym Gyngell as Wills.

In November 2009 the Royal Australian Mint issued two coins, $1 and a 20 cent, to commemorate the 150th anniversary of the expedition.

Heritage listings 
Heritage listings associated with the Burke and Wills expedition include:
 Burke and Wills Dig Tree near Thargomindah within Durham, Shire of Bulloo, listed on the Queensland Heritage Register
 Burke and Wills Plant Camp near Betoota within Birdsville, Shire of Diamantina, listed on the Queensland Heritage Register
 Burke and Wills Camp B/CXIX near Normanton, Shire of Carpentaria, listed on the Queensland Heritage Register

See also
History of Australia
Royal Society of Victoria
List of places associated with the Burke and Wills expedition

References

Further reading

 Burke and Wills Web – online digital archive  by Dave Phoenix
 The [Melbourne] Argus, 1861. "The Burke and Wills exploring expedition: An account of the crossing the continent of Australia from Cooper Creek to Carpentaria, with biographical sketches of Robert O'Hara Burke and William John Wills." Melbourne: Wilson and Mackinnon.
 Bergin, Thomas John, & Australian Broadcasting Corporation, 1981. In the steps of Burke and Wills. Sydney: Australian Broadcasting Commission. .
 Bergin, Thomas John, & Reader's Digest, 1996. Across the outback.. Surrey Hills: Reader's Digest. .
 Bonyhady, Tim, 1991. Burke and Wills: From Melbourne to myth. Balmain: David Ell Press. .
 Burke and Wills Outback Conference 2003, 2005. The Inaugural Burke & Wills Outback Conference: Cloncurry 2003 : a collation of presentations. Cairns: Dave Phoenix. 
 
 Clune, Frank, 1937. Dig: A drama of central Australia. Sydney: Angus and Robertson.
 Colwell, Max, 1971. The journey of Burke and Wills. Sydney: Paul Hamlyn. .
 Corke, David G, 1996. The Burke and Wills Expedition: A study in evidence. Melbourne: Educational Media International. .
 Ferguson, Charles D, 1888. Experiences of a Forty-Niner during the thirty-four years residence in California and Australia. Cleveland, Ohio: The Williams Publishing Co.
 Fitzpatrick, Kathleen, 1963. "The Burke and Wills Expedition and the Royal Society of Victoria." Historical Studies of Australia and New Zealand. Vol. 10 (No. 40), pp. 470–478.
 Judge, Joseph, & Scherschel, Joseph J, 1979. "First across Australia: The journey of Burke and Wills." National Geographic Magazine, Vol. 155, February 1979, pp. 152–191.
 Leahy, Frank, 2007. "Locating the 'Plant Camp' of the Burke and Wills expedition." Journal of Spatial Science, No. 2, December 2007, pp. 1–12.
 Moorehead, Alan McCrae, 1963. Coopers Creek. London: Hamish Hamilton.
 Murgatroyd, Sarah, 2002. The Dig Tree. Melbourne: Text Publishing. .
 Phoenix, Dave, 2003. From Melbourne to the Gulf: A brief history of the VEE of 1860–1. Cairns: Self published .
Phoenix, Dave, 2015. Following Burke and Wills across Australia, CSIRO Publishing .
 Records of the Burke and Wills Expedition, 1857-1875.  Manuscript MS 13071. Australian Manuscripts Collection. State Library Victoria (Australia)
Van der Kiste, John, 2011. William John Wills: Pioneer of the Australian outback. Stroud: History Press. .
 Victoria: Parliament, 1862. Burke and Wills Commission. Report of the Commissioners appointed to enquire into and report upon the circumstances connected with the sufferings and death of Robert O'Hara Burke and William John Wills, the Victorian Explorers. Melbourne: John Ferres Government Printer. 
 White, John, 1992. Burke and Wills: The stockade and the tree. Footscray, Vic: The Victoria University of Technology Library in association with Footprint Press.

External links

 Burke & Wills Web – online digital archive.  A comprehensive online digital archive containing transcripts of many of the historical documents relating to the Burke & Wills Expedition.
 The Burke & Wills Historical Society. 
 Dig: The Burke and Wills Research Gateway. The State Library of Victoria's online exhibition and resources.
 The Burke and Wills collection  at the National Museum of Australia, Canberra.
 The Diary of William John Wills.  The diary written by Wills while at the Cooper from 23 April 1861 to 28 June 1861, which is held at the National Library of Australia, Canberra.
 The Diary of William John Wills.  Images of the diary at the National Library of Australia.
 William Strutt online collection of drawings in watercolour, ink and pencil . held by the State Library of New South Wales, DL PXX 3 and DL PXX 4
 The Royal Society of Victoria. 

 
1860 in Australia
1861 in Australia
History of Australia (1851–1900)
Exploration of Australia
History of Melbourne
Botanical expeditions
Australian expeditions